The National Democratic Reconciliation Party (PRDN or REDENCION) was a moderate conservative party in Guatemala.

History
The PRDN was founded in March 1950 by General Miguel Ydígoras Fuentes. Ydígoras finished as the runner-up in the November 1950 presidential elections with 19% of the vote. He finished as runner-up again in the 1957 elections, but the results were annulled due to fraud. In the fresh elections the following year, Ydígoras received the largest vote share (41%) and was confirmed as President by a vote in Congress, in which the PRDN-led coalition had won a majority of seats. The PRDN retained its Congressional majority in the 1959 and 1961 elections.

Ydígoras was removed from office by a 1963 coup, after which the party was disbanded.

References

Defunct political parties in Guatemala
Political parties established in 1950
1950 establishments in Guatemala
Political parties disestablished in 1963
1963 disestablishments in Guatemala